"Animal" is a song by American singer Trey Songz, released as the third single from Tremaine the Album, on March 17, 2017.

Composition
"Animal" was written by Songz and produced by Dr. Luke, Made in China, Osta, Cirkut and Jmike. In the track he celebrates the beauty of sexual temptation, enjoying himself during wild one-night stands. The song was compared to R. Kelly's 2007 track "The Zoo" because of its theme of sex and animals.

Music video 
Its music video, directed by Songz, showcases libidinal themes, dominated by mirrored rooms and various promiscuous positions. In the video Songz is surrounded by a group of half-naked women dancing during a game of strip poker.

Charts

References

Trey Songz songs
2017 singles
2017 songs
Atlantic Records singles
Songs written by Trey Songz
Songs written by Dr. Luke